The Rich  Mountain Wilderness is a wilderness area within the Chattahoochee National Forest in Gilmer County, Georgia, in the United States. The Wilderness is managed by the United States Forest Service and is part of the National Wilderness Preservation System.

The highest elevation in the Rich Mountain Wilderness is the  peak of Rich Mountain.  The land that forms the Wilderness is characterized by the same sort of deep, black porter's loam found in the Cohutta Mountains.  The Wilderness is home to several threatened or endangered species.

External links 
Wilderness.net entry for the Rich Mountain Wilderness
Map of Rich Mountain Wilderness
Sherpa Guide for Rich Mountain Wilderness
Rich Mountain Wilderness on Backpacker.com

Protected areas of Gilmer County, Georgia
IUCN Category Ib
Wilderness areas of Georgia (U.S. state)
Protected areas of the Appalachians
Protected areas established in 1986
Chattahoochee-Oconee National Forest
1986 establishments in Georgia (U.S. state)